zgv is an image viewer for SVGAlib or SDL that incorporates a thumbnail-based file selector. Most file formats supported include GIF, JPEG, PNG, BMP, PCX, PCD, TIFF. Thumbnails used are compatible with xv, xzgv, and GIMP. 

There is also a version of zgv available for X11, released under the name xzgv.

External links 
 Home page
 
 LSM entry

Free image viewers
Free software programmed in C
Linux image viewers
SVGAlib programs
Free software that uses SDL